, known professionally as , is a Japanese model represented by Starray Production.

Public image

Ryuchell originally spelled his stage name in hiragana, but since 2018, when he first debuted as a singer, he had switched to spelling it with the Roman alphabet. As a model, Ryuchell was one of the key influential figures for the genderless fashion subculture and has been heavily associated with it.

Personal life

Ryuchell's older sister is singer Chiharu Higa. Ryuchell also attended the same high school with JO1 member Sho Yonashiro.

On December 31, 2016, Ryuchell married model Peco. In July 2018, they announced the birth of their son, named Link after Link Larkin from Hairspray.

On August 25, 2022, Ryuchell announced through Instagram that he no longer identified under male gender roles, which he had felt had burdened him throughout his marriage, and that he would rather be considered as a "life partner" and "parent" to his family instead. Ryuchell and Peco's agencies confirmed that the two had gotten divorced, but they denied the couple was living separately.

Filmography

Film

TV series

Stage

Discography

Albums

References

External links
 

Japanese male models
1995 births
Living people
People from Okinawa Prefecture
Models from Okinawa Prefecture